Anthony Roman Agr.Sc. (January 17, 1936 in Veľký Ruskov, Czechoslovakia – October 30, 1992 in Markham, Ontario) was a politician in Ontario, Canada.

Early years
Roman was born in Czechoslovakia and eventually settled in Canada. He studied agricultural science
and was a businessman before entering politics.

Municipal career
Roman served as the Township Councillor (1966-1968), Mayor of the Town of Markham, Ontario from 1970 to 1984, Chair of the Regional Municipality of York in 1984.

Provincial politics
Roman was the Ontario Progressive Conservative Party candidate in York Centre in the 1975 Ontario general election, placing second behind Liberal Alfred Stong.

Federal politics
In 1984 Roman was elected as an independent Member of Parliament (MP) for the riding of York North from 1984 to 1988.

Roman won the 1984 election in York North largely because of the controversial views of Progressive Conservative MP John Gamble.

Because the PC and Liberal candidates were unpopular, community leaders asked Roman to stand as a "Coalition Candidate". Roman used the PC blue and Liberal red on his signs, and drew supporters from both parties.

He was one of the very few MPs in recent decades to be elected as an independent candidate in the House of Commons of Canada.

Return to municipal politics

Roman did not seek re-election to the House of Commons in 1988 but instead endorsed Micheal O'Brien as the Progressive Conservative Candidate. Micheal O'Brien was one of the community leaders who had convinced Roman to run as a "Coalition" independent in 1984. Roman was returned as mayor of Markham, defeating Carole Bell, who had succeeded Roman as mayor upon his appointment as York chairman in 1984. He was easily re-elected in the 1991 municipal elections.

Community involvement

Roman (along with financial backing from his uncle and businessman Stephen Boleslav Roman) was instrumental in the design and construction of the Cathedral of the Transfiguration, a large Slovak Byzantine church built on open land in northwestern Markham.

Death

Roman died while still in office as Mayor in 1992.

Honours

Roman's name lives on in Markham:

 Anthony Roman Avenue, a small residential street in Cathedraltown, Ontario
 Roman Road in Thornhill, Ontario is most likely named after Tony Roman
 Anthony Roman Centre - Markham Civic Centre - Flato Markham Theatre - Unionville High School
 Anthony Roman Award
 Tony Roman Memorial Tournament - ice hockey ended in 2013 after 40 years

See also
 List of mayors of Markham, Ontario

External links

References

1936 births
1992 deaths
Czechoslovak emigrants to Canada
Independent MPs in the Canadian House of Commons
Mayors of Markham, Ontario
Members of the House of Commons of Canada from Ontario
Naturalized citizens of Canada
People from the Banská Bystrica Region
Canadian people of Slovak descent
People from Markham, Ontario